Reach for the Sky is a 1956 British biographical film about aviator Douglas Bader, based on the 1954 biography of the same name by Paul Brickhill. The film stars Kenneth More and was directed by Lewis Gilbert. It won the BAFTA Award for Best British Film of 1956. The film's composer John Addison was Bader's brother-in-law.

Plot
In 1928, Douglas Bader joins the Royal Air Force (RAF) as a Flight Cadet. Despite a friendly reprimand from Air Vice-Marshal Halahan for his disregard for service discipline and flight rules, he successfully completes his training and is posted to No. 23 Squadron at RAF Kenley. In 1930, he is chosen to be among the pilots for an aerial exhibition.

Later, although his flight commander has explicitly banned low level aerobatics (as two pilots have been killed trying just that), he is goaded into it by a disparaging remark by a civilian pilot. The wing tip of his bi-plane touches the ground during his flight and he crashes dramatically, and is clearly badly injured.

Mr Joyce, surgeon at the Royal Berkshire Hospital, has to amputate both legs to save Bader's life. During his convalescence, he receives encouragement from Nurse Brace. Upon his discharge from the hospital, he sets out to master prosthetic legs. Out for a drive with two other RAF pals, they stop at a tearoom, and here he meets waitress Thelma Edwards. Once he can walk on his own, he asks her out.

Despite his undiminished skills, he is refused flying duties simply because there are no regulations covering his situation. Offered a desk job instead, he leaves the RAF and works unhappily in an office. He and Thelma marry at a registry office on a wet afternoon.

As the Second World War starts, Bader talks himself back into the RAF. He is soon given command of a squadron comprising mostly dispirited Canadians who had fought in France. Improving morale and brazenly circumventing normal channels to obtain badly needed equipment, he makes the squadron operational again. They fight effectively in the Battle of Britain. Bader is then put in charge of a new, larger formation of five squadrons. Later, he is posted to RAF Tangmere and promoted to wing commander.

In 1941, Bader has to bail out over France. He is caught, escapes, and is recaptured. He then makes such a nuisance of himself to his jailers, he is repeatedly moved from one POW camp to another, finally ending up in Colditz Castle. He is liberated after four years of captivity. The war ends (much to Thelma's relief) before Bader can have "one last fling" in the Far East.

On 15 September 1945, the fifth anniversary of the greatest day of the Battle of Britain, Bader, now a group captain, is given the honour of leading eleven other battle survivors and a total of 300 aircraft in a flypast over London.

Cast

Credited

 Kenneth More as Flight Cadet (later Group Captain) Douglas Bader
 Muriel Pavlow as Thelma Edwards (later Bader)
 Lyndon Brook as Flight Cadet (later Wing Commander) Johnny Sanderson 
 Lee Patterson as Flying Officer (later Group Captain) Stan Turner
 Alexander Knox as Mr J. Leonard Joyce, surgeon at Royal Berkshire Hospital
 Dorothy Alison as Nurse Brace, Royal Berkshire Hospital
 Michael Warre as Flight Lieutenant (later Group Captain) Harry Day
 Sydney Tafler as Robert Desoutter, prosthetics expert
 Howard Marion-Crawford as Wing Commander (later Group Captain) Alfred "Woody" Woodhall
 Jack Watling as Peel
 Nigel Green as Streatfield
 Anne Leon as Sister Thornhill
 Charles Carson as Air Chief Marshal Sir Hugh Dowding
 Ronald Adam as Air Vice-Marshal (later Air Chief Marshal Sir) Trafford Leigh-Mallory

 Walter Hudd as Air Vice-Marshal Frederick Halahan
 Basil Appleby as Flying Officer (later Air Marshal Sir) Denis Crowley-Milling
 Philip Stainton as Police Constable
 Eddie Byrne as Flight Sergeant Mills, RAF Cranwell instructor
 Beverley Brooks as Sally, Bader's girlfriend
 Michael Ripper as Warrant Officer West, 242 Squadron crew chief
 Derek Blomfield as Civilian Pilot at Reading Aero Club
 Avice Landone as Douglas Bader's Mother
 Eric Pohlmann as Adjutant at Prison Camp
 Michael Gough as Flying Officer W. J. "Pissy" Pearson, RAF Cranwell flying instructor
 Harry Locke as Bates, Bader's batman
 Sam Kydd as Warrant Officer Blake, Air Ministry medical clerk

Uncredited

 Frank Atkinson as Tullin, Desoutter's assistant
 Balbina as Lucille Debacker, nurse at St Omer hospital
 Michael Balfour as Orderly
 Trevor Bannister as Man Listening to Radio
 Victor Beaumont as German Doctor at St Omer hospital
 Peter Burton as Peter, officer at RAF Coltishall
 Peter Byrne as Civilian Pilot at Reading Aero Club
 Paul Carpenter as Hall, 242 Squadron
 Hugh David as Flight Cadet Taylor, RAF Cranwell
 Stringer Davis as Cyril Borge
 Guy du Monceau as Gilbert Petit, French Resistance
 Anton Diffring as German Stabsfeldwebel in French Village
 Basil Dignam as Air Ministry Doctor
 Raymond Francis as Wing Commander Hargreaves
 Alice Gachet as Madame Hiecque, French Resistance

 Philip Gilbert as Canadian Pilot with 242 Squadron
 Fred Griffiths as Lorry Driver
 Alexander Harris as Don Richardson
 Charles Lamb as Walker, Desoutter's assistant
 Jack Lambert as Adrian Stoop
 Barry Letts as Tommy
 Richard Marner as German Officer in Staff Car
 Roger Maxwell as Man at the Pantiles
 Rene Poirier as Monsieur Hiecque, French Resistance
 Clive Revill as RAF Medical Orderly at RAF Uxbridge
 George Rose as Squadron Leader Edwards, staff officer, Fighter Command
 John Stone as Limping Officer
 Jack Taylor as British Pilot with 242 Squadron
 Russell Waters as Pearson
 Ernest Clark as Wing Commander W. K. Beiseigel
 Gareth Wigan as Woodhall's Assistant

Aircraft

Production
To depict the various Royal Air Force bases realistically, principal filming took place in Surrey at RAF Kenley, and around the town of Caterham. The cricket match was filmed at nearby Whyteleafe recreation ground. Studio work was completed at Pinewood Studios. Available wartime combat aircraft including Hawker Hurricane and Supermarine Spitfire fighters were arranged to take on the aerial scenes.

Richard Burton was the first choice for the lead but he dropped out when he was offered the lead in Alexander the Great at what Gilbert describes as "three or four times the salary".

Kenneth More was cast instead at a fee of £25,000. Producer Daniel Angel recalled:
My wife said to me, 'Kenneth More is Douglas Bader.' And so he was! He was a good actor, but, looking back, I don't think he was all that versatile and he wasn't physically a very attractive man. He couldn't play love scenes. He was more of a playboy type. He was Douglas Bader! Bader wasn't a technical adviser but I suppose Kenny More modelled himself physically on Bader.

More arranged to meet Bader to prepare for the role. They played a round of golf; much to More's surprise (as he was a good golfer), Bader beat him decisively.

Lewis Gilbert said Douglas Bader was difficult to deal with.
When he read the script he said I had made a terrible hash of it because I'd cut out a lot of his friends. I pointed out that the book contained hundreds of names and I had to cut it down or else the film would run for three days. He said, 'That's your problem. If you don't get my friends in, I won't double for the film,' because he was going to double for Kenneth More in long shots. I explained to him that that wouldn't stop the film being made; I said that we would undoubtedly find someone with a disability similar to his - which he did. In fact a number of his friends had helped me with the script, although we didn't tell Douglas that. Douglas wasn't in the film at all.

Angel later said that his favourite part of the film was when Bader was trying to learn how to walk again in hospital. "I've been in hospital myself, on and off since the war, and I'd seen a lot of that sort of thing," he later said. "It was a very touching performance from Dorothy Alison, who seemed to sum up so much in a few moments." Alison received a BAFTA nomination for Best British Actress.

The film's composer John Addison was Bader's brother-in-law.

Reception
The film fared well with the public, being the most popular film in the UK for 1956. When the film was released in North America in 1957, the American release version was slightly altered with 12 minutes edited out. The Rank Organisation, the film's distributor, made a concerted effort to ensure the film was successful in America, sending Kenneth More over to do a press tour, and setting up Rank's own distribution arm in North America, but the public was not enthusiastic.
Because Bader had fallen out with Brickhill over the split of royalties from the book, he refused to attend the premiere, and only saw the film for the first time eleven years later, on television.

When the film was released, people associated Bader with the quiet and amiable personality of actor More. Bader recognised that the producers had deleted all those habits he displayed when on operations, particularly his prolific use of bad language. Bader once said, "[they] still think [I'm] the dashing chap Kenneth More was."

It won the BAFTA Award for Best British Film of 1956.

References

Notes

Citations

Bibliography

 Bader, Douglas. Fight for the Sky: The Story of the Spitfire and Hurricane. Ipswich, Suffolk, UK: W.S. Cowell Ltd., 2004. . 
 Brickhill, Paul. Reach for the Sky: The Story of Douglas Bader DSO, DFC. London: Odhams Press Ltd., 1954. . 
 Dando-Collins, Stephen. The Hero Maker: A Biography of Paul Brickhill. Sydney, Penguin Random House, 2016. . 
 Dolan, Edward F. Jr. Hollywood Goes to War. London: Bison Books, 1985. .
 Hardwick, Jack and Ed Schnepf. "A Buff's Guide to Aviation Movies". Air Progress Aviation Vol. 7, No. 1, Spring 1983.
 McFarlane, Brian. An Autobiography of British Cinema. London: Methuen, 1997. .
 Mackenzie, S.P. Bader's War. London: Spellmount Publishers, 2008. .
 More, Kenneth. More or Less. London: Hodder & Staughton, 1978. .

External links
 
 
 
 Original Vintage Quad Poster for Reach for the Sky at Picture Palace Movie Posters

1956 films
1950s war films
1950s biographical drama films
British war drama films
British biographical drama films
British aviation films
Battle of Britain films
Films about shot-down aviators
Films based on non-fiction books
Films based on works by Paul Brickhill
Royal Air Force mass media
World War II films based on actual events
World War II prisoner of war films
Films set in the 1920s
Films set in the 1930s
Films set in England
Best British Film BAFTA Award winners
Films shot at Pinewood Studios
Films directed by Lewis Gilbert
Films about amputees
Films scored by John Addison
1956 drama films
1957 drama films
British black-and-white films
Biographical films about aviators
1950s English-language films
1950s British films
Films about disability